Martin Haselböck (born 23 November 1954, Vienna, Austria) is the Austrian musical director of Musica Angelica in Long Beach, California, United States, and the musical director and founder of the Orchester Wiener Akademie. He is also a professor at the University of Music and Performing Arts Vienna, where he teaches organ.

Decorations and awards
 Austrian Cross of Honour for Science and Art (1997)
 Prague Mozart Prize (1991)
 Hungarian Liszt Prize
 Grand Decoration of Honour for Services to the Republic of Austria (2010)

References

External links
 Artist's personal Homepage (in German)
 Haselböck's biography (in German)
 Vienna Academy Orchestra Homepage (in German)
 Musica Angelica Homepage
 Haselböck's American artist-representative page
 Unofficial biography by Bach Cantatas Website
 University of Music and Performing Arts Vienna (in German)
 
 

1954 births
Living people
Musicians from Vienna
Academic staff of the University of Vienna
Recipients of the Austrian Cross of Honour for Science and Art
Recipients of the Grand Decoration for Services to the Republic of Austria